Teletoon is a Canadian English-language discretionary specialty channel owned by Corus Entertainment. The channel primarily broadcasts animated series aimed at children and teenagers.

It was launched on October 17, 1997, by Teletoon Canada, Inc., a consortium of Western International Communications and Astral Media (via its specialty network Family Channel), Shaw Communications (via its specialty network YTV), and the animation studios Cinar and Nelvana. By 2014, Corus had become the sole owner of the network.

The channel has historically aired a mix of domestic productions and imported series, with many of the latter coming from U.S. channel Cartoon Network. In 2012, Teletoon launched a Canadian version of Cartoon Network as a sister network under license from Turner Broadcasting. In February 2023, Corus announced that Teletoon would rebrand as Cartoon Network on March 27, 2023, with the previous Cartoon Network channel concurrently rebranding under Cartoon Network's own sister brand Boomerang.

Teletoon operates two timeshift feeds running on Eastern and Pacific schedules. Along with its French-language counterpart Télétoon, it is available in over 7.3 million households in Canada as of November 2013.

History

As Teletoon 
In 1997, Teletoon was licensed by the Canadian Radio-television and Telecommunications Commission (CRTC) after a related application for a channel to be called "Fun TV" had been denied. The channel launched on October 17, 1997. The channel was originally owned by a consortium of other Canadian specialty services, including Family Channel acting as managing partner at 53.3% (Superchannel/WIC and The Movie Network/Astral Media), YTV at 26.7%, (Shaw Communications), along with the Canadian animation studios Cinar and Nelvana with 10% each. Shaw spun off its entertainment assets as Corus Entertainment in 1999, which subsequently acquired WIC's stake in Family Channel among other assets as part of its breakup later that year, Corus acquired Nelvana in 2000.

Teletoon is licensed as a bilingual service in both English and French, being one of only two Canadian specialty services with such a license; the channel maintains two feeds under the license, with the French feed operating under the branding Télétoon. At the original licensing hearing before the CRTC, the network's operators had stated that the two channels "would be similar in nature and programmed with a similar attitude towards them", but that there may be differences in their programming due to market differences (including Quebec's prohibition on advertising to children) and program rights. To this end, Teletoon has often commissioned programming to air in both English and French whenever possible.

As a condition of license, Teletoon committed to devote 40% of its programming to Canadian content in its first year of operation, gradually increasing by five percent yearly to 60% by 2002. Over a similar timeframe, it also made a commitment to similarly have at least half of its programming financed by, and commissioned from third-parties unaffiliated with its owners.

In 1998, network management decided to focus on renewals instead of new shows—adopting a more cautious strategy than launching a significant number of new series, as it had in the prior year. By 2001, the channel had invested over $96 million into 98 original productions since its launch; Teletoon's director of original programming Madeleine Levesque stated that "I don’t think any other broadcaster has contributed so much, so well, so fast."

On March 4, 2013, Corus Entertainment announced that it would acquire Astral's stake in Teletoon, giving it full ownership. The sale was part of divestitures tied to Astral Media's proposed sale to Bell Media, which had earlier been rejected by the CRTC in October 2012 for competition reasons. Corus's purchase was cleared by the Competition Bureau two weeks later on March 18; the transaction was approved by the CRTC on December 20, 2013, and completed on January 1, 2014. The channel was subsequently brought under the new Corus Kids division as part of a reorganization in February 2014, alongside YTV and Nelvana. Teletoon and its sister networks would maintain separate management from YTV.

As Cartoon Network 
On February 21, 2023, Corus announced that Teletoon would be rebranded as Cartoon Network on March 27, 2023. The latter brand has existed in two previous Canadian incarnations under Corus ownership, beginning in 2012, with the second having replaced Teletoon Retro in 2015. The latter's current channel space will concurrently relaunch under Cartoon Network's sibling brand Boomerang (which will be devoted to library programming and classic franchises); the Teletoon brand will continue to be used for its companion streaming service Teletoon+ and the French-language channel Télétoon.

Programming

Teletoon's license originally required that 90% of all programs on the channel be animated. Teletoon previously aired preschool-oriented programming, which was day-parted from 4:00 a.m.- 3:00 p.m. At its inception in 1996, Teletoon had a stated goal of producing 78 half-hours of original content every year, and it has been active in commissioning programming since then.

Since its inception, Teletoon has acquired numerous television series from the U.S.-based Cartoon Network and its late night block, Adult Swim. From September 1, 2015, to Fall 2016, original programming from the American channel was moved over to its Canadian counterpart. Around the same time, several "retro" programs airing on Teletoon Retro, which closed down on the same date, began airing on Teletoon. Teletoon would also premiere new original programming from Cartoon Network's sister channel, Boomerang.

On April 1, 2019, following the relaunch of Action as a full-time Adult Swim channel, Teletoon's adult-oriented programs were moved to Adult Swim; with Teletoon shifting to family-oriented programming.

Notable programming blocks
Teletoon Unleashed! – launched in 2000, Teletoon Unleashed! was an adult-oriented block of the channel; it co-existed with The Detour on Teletoon until the block merged with it in 2004. It was known for airing every show with an 18+ rating to attract an adult audience, regardless of whether the program actually contained adults-only material or not. It was discontinued in 2004 due to lack of new content, since 90% of the material were shows with a limited amount of episodes, leading to frequent rerun. It was also found that The Detour on Teletoon and Unleashed! attracted a similar mixed audience of teens and adults, hence the amalgamation.
 Teletoon Retro – Teletoon Retro was the branding and block for classic animated programming. It was later spun into a digital channel, which also featured several live-action series. The channel launched on October 1, 2007, and closed on September 1, 2015. 
 Can't Miss Thursdays – A block for first-run programming premieres that aired on Thursday nights. The block later featured live-action, hosted segments.
 Superfan Fridays – A block showcasing comic book-related and action-oriented animated series.

Branding history
Initially, Teletoon's programming was divided into dayparted blocks, each featuring a different style of animation. Each blocks were represented as planets: Morning Planet for Preschoolers (claymation animation; 5:00 a.m. -3:00 p.m. EST), Afternoon Planet for Kids (2D cel animation; 3:00 p.m.- 6:00 p.m.), Evening Planet for Family (collage animation; 6:00 p.m. - 9:00 p.m. EST) and Night Planet for Adult (papier-mâché animation; 9:00 p.m. - 5:00 a.m. EST). The bumpers were made by Cuppa Coffee Studios. This branding would be discontinued in August 1998.

From August 1998 to 1999, Teletoon was airing bumpers with its first mascot, "Teletina". These bumpers were made by Spin Productions in Toronto. 

Several more bumpers using CGI animation made by Guru Studio subsequently premiered on the channel. An updated look for the channel was unveiled, along with a new logo, for a partial rebranding in 2005.

Related services
On November 24, 2000, the Canadian Radio-television and Telecommunications Commission (CRTC) approved multiple applications from Teletoon Canada Inc. to launch six Category 2 television channels named Teletoon Action, Teletoon Adult, Teletoon Art, Teletoon Multi, Teletoon Pop and Teletoon Retro. None of the channels launched and their broadcast licenses expired on November 24, 2004. The Teletoon Retro concept would later be revived under a different license.

Current

Télétoon

Télétoon is the French counterpart to Teletoon which broadcasts most of the shows from its English counterpart in French.

Cartoon Network

On November 4, 2011, the Canadian Radio-television and Telecommunications Commission (CRTC) approved an application from Teletoon to launch Teletoon Kapow!, a Category B digital cable and satellite channel devoted "programming from international markets, featuring the latest trends in non-violent action, adventure, superheroes, comedy and interactivity." On February 2, 2012, Teletoon announced that it would launch a local Cartoon Network channel in Canada. It debuted using the Teletoon Kapow! license on July 4, 2012.

As of September 1, 2015, Cartoon Network operates under the broadcast license originally granted for Teletoon Retro. Corus then had the Teletoon Kapow! license revoked on October 2, 2015.

Teletoon+
Teletoon+ is a subscription video on demand service which launched September 1, 2022 on Amazon Prime Video Channels, replacing Corus's previous Nick+ service (which was a streaming counterpart to its Nickelodeon channel). The service features exclusive content acquired from Cartoon Network and Warner Bros. Animation.

Former

Teletoon Retro

Teletoon Retro was a Category B digital cable and satellite channel that debuted in Fall 2007, and was named after a program block that featured classic animated series. Shows seen on the channel included The Tom and Jerry Show, The Bugs Bunny & Tweety Show, Scooby-Doo, The Flintstones, The Raccoons, The Jetsons, The Pink Panther, Fat Albert and the Cosby Kids, Inspector Gadget, and Gumby; several classic films also aired on it.

The channel was discontinued on September 1, 2015, with Disney Channel Canada (on Bell Aliant, Bell Satellite TV, EastLink, Telus Optik TV, VMedia, Vidéotron, MTS, Bell Fibe TV, NorthernTel, Novus, and Zazeen), or Cartoon Network (on Shaw Direct/Shaw Cable, Rogers Cable, SaskTel, and Westman Communications) taking over its slot on several aforementioned providers. In the years since, Teletoon has aired classic programming during non-peak viewing hours.

Teletoon at Night

Launched in September 2002 as "The Detour on Teletoon", the block is an amalgamation of it and "Teletoon Unleashed", an adult programming block. Its French counterpart, Télétoon la nuit, airs on the Francophone Télétoon channel. In September 2009, the block was relaunched under its current name with an overhaul of its appearance.

In March 2019, with the pending launch of the Adult Swim channel on April 1, 2019, it was announced that the block would be discontinued.

References

External links
 
 Teletoon on Corus Entertainment

 
English-language television stations in Canada
Analog cable television networks in Canada
Children's television networks in Canada
Corus Entertainment networks
Television channels and stations established in 1997
1997 establishments in Canada